Hananel Meller is a former Israeli footballer who played with Maccabi Netanya.

References

Possibly living people
Israeli Jews
Israeli footballers
Maccabi Netanya F.C. players
Year of birth missing
Association footballers not categorized by position